Alan Oppenheimer (born April 23, 1930) is an American actor. He has performed numerous roles on live action television since the 1960s, and he has had an active career doing voice work since the 1970s.

Early life
Oppenheimer was born in New York City on April 23, 1930, to Louis and Irene Oppenheimer. His father worked as a stockbroker.

Career

Character roles
As a character actor, Oppenheimer has had diverse roles in popular American television programming, from playing a Nazi in Hogan's Heroes, to playing an Israeli secret agent as well as a double-agent KAOS scientist on Get Smart, to being the second actor to play Dr. Rudy Wells in The Six Million Dollar Man (Martin Balsam played the role in the pilot film). Oppenheimer took over as Rudy starting with the second film, "Wine, Women and War" up until the introduction of the bionic woman in 1975, whereupon Martin E. Brooks took over as Wells until cancellation). He was the original Mickey Malph (Ralph Malph's dad) on Happy Days. He played a recurring role during the first two seasons of St. Elsewhere as Helen Rosenthal's husband, Ira. He had a recurring role as Mayor Alvin B. Tutwiller on Mama's Family.

He then continued in science fiction genre in the 1973 cult classic Westworld, where he played the head IT technician. He has also appeared in three Star Trek series, always playing a different character. He appeared in the Star Trek: The Next Generation episode "Rightful Heir" as a Klingon cleric, Koroth, a primary instigator of the cloning of Kahless; on Deep Space Nine as a Starfleet Captain Declan Keogh in command of the USS Odyssey; and as an alien ambassador in Voyager.

Oppenheimer also appeared as film director Cecil B. DeMille in the 1994 Broadway production of Andrew Lloyd Webber's Sunset Blvd.

Voice acting

Oppenheimer has voiced many characters, often for Filmation in the 1970s and 1980s, such as Oil Can Harry, Swifty and the narrator on The New Adventures of Mighty Mouse and Heckle & Jeckle, Ming the Merciless on Flash Gordon, the Overlord on BlackStar, Skeletor, Man-At-Arms and Mer-Man from Filmation's 1980s cartoon He-Man and the Masters of the Universe, and the voice of Prime Evil in the 1986 TV series, Filmation's Ghostbusters. Other notable voice roles include Thundarr the Barbarian, Vanity on The Smurfs, Rhinokey and Crock from The Wuzzles and Falkor, Gmork, Rockbiter, and the Narrator from 1984's The NeverEnding Story. In the early 1990s, Oppenheimer was the voice of Merlin in The Legend of Prince Valiant. He also provided the voice of Barkerville in the Pound Puppies TV special. He also voiced Fraidy Cat on Fraidy Cat in 1975 and provided additional voices on Battle of the Planets in 1978.

Oppenheimer worked on The Transformers, most notably as two contrasting characters, the pacifist Beachcomber and the bellicose Warpath. His rendition of Seaspray was remarkably similar to Mer-Man, including the gurgling effects. He took over the voice of Roger Smith's butler Norman Burg in the English dub of the second season of The Big O. He was the voice of the unseen Alistair Crane on the soap opera Passions up until 2004, when the character was made fully visible and played by David Bailey. More recently, he provided the voice of the Scientist for the 2009 film 9 and Batman's butler Alfred Pennyworth in Superman/Batman: Public Enemies.

Oppenheimer's repertoire also includes video games, voicing Dr. Piotr Ivanovich in Soldier of Fortune II: Double Helix, Prometheus in God of War II and Jandor the Airship Captain in Nox. In Fallout: Brotherhood of Steel, he spoke the part of Harold, an ancient mutated survivor of nuclear holocaust who has appeared in four of the Fallout series games, and played the roles of The Chariot Master and Dyntos, God of the Forge, in Kid Icarus: Uprising. Oppenheimer also voiced the parts of a non-player character Soldier and the Wasteland Trader, and the NPC 'enemies' Cult Ghoul Thug and Kamikaze in Fallout: BoS. Also, in the English TG-16 port of Ys Book I and II, Oppenheimer voiced the roles of the Narrator, and the game's lead antagonist, Darm.

In 2019 he guest-starred on the animated series Tigtone and in Toy Story 4 as Old Timer.

Personal life
Oppenheimer married costume designer Marianna Elliott in 1958 and together they had three children. The couple divorced, but wed again in 1992 and remained married until her death in 2003. In 1984, he wed professional tennis player Marilyn Greenwood. They divorced in 1990.

Filmography

Films

Television

Video games
 1990 – Ys I & II – Narrator, Darm
 1999 – T'ai Fu: Wrath of the Tiger – Leopard Master
 1999 – Revenant – Ogrok, Urgg
 2000 – Nox – Captain, Necromancer 1, Lewis
 2000 – Baldur's Gate II: Shadows of Amn – Guardian Telwyn, Sir Sarles, Mornmaster Thaddin Dawnhunter
 2000 – Star Trek: Starfleet Command II: Empires at War – Additional voices
 2000 – Invictus – Additional voices
 2001 – Fallout Tactics: Brotherhood of Steel –  Harold, Cult Ghoul Thug, Cult Ghoul Soldier
 2002 – Earth & Beyond –  Memnon
 2002 – Soldier of Fortune II: Double Helix –  Dr. Piotr Ivanovich
 2003 – Lionheart: Legacy of the Crusader – Additional voices
 2004 – Fallout: Brotherhood of Steel – Harold, Cult Ghoul Thug,Soldier
 2004 – Baldur's Gate: Dark Alliance II – Additional voices
 2004 – Law & Order: Justice Is Served – Charles Northcutt
 2004 – The Bard's Tale – Additional voices
 2007 – God of War II – Prometheus
 2008 – Robert Ludlum's The Bourne Conspiracy – Additional voices
 2008 – Tom Clancy's EndWar – Additional voices
 2012 – Kid Icarus: Uprising – Chariot Master, Dyntos (English dub)
 2015 – Fallout 4 – Paladin Brandis

Awards and nominations
 1991 – Nominated – Primetime Emmy Award for Outstanding Guest Actor in a Comedy Series as Eugene Kinsella in Murphy Brown

References

External links

 
 
 

1930 births
Living people
American male film actors
American male stage actors
American male television actors
American male video game actors
American male voice actors
American people of German-Jewish descent
Filmation people
Jewish American male actors
20th-century American male actors
21st-century American male actors